The 2002 Portuguese legislative election took place on 17 March. The election renewed all 230 members of the Assembly of the Republic.

These elections were called after the resignation of the then incumbent Prime Minister, António Guterres after the defeat of the Socialist Party in the 2001 local elections. That fact, plus the problematic state of the country's finances were the main arguments of the right-wing parties, which led them to be the favourites to win the election.

With just over 40% of the votes cast, the Social Democrats regained the status as the largest political force in Portugal, although the Socialists won almost 38% of the vote. This was, and still is, the smallest difference between the two major parties in Portugal. This short distance also appears on the electoral map, with each party winning eleven of the 22 districts, while the PS won the most populous, Lisbon and Porto. As a result, the Social Democrats fail to win the absolute majority they had between 1987 and 1995.

As no Party got an absolute majority, the Social Democrats formed a coalition with the right-wing People's Party. The left-wing Democratic Unity Coalition achieved the lowest result ever, finishing in the third place in its traditional strongholds, Évora and Setúbal. The Left Bloc gained one MP. Turnout was slightly higher than it was in 1999 but remained quite low, marking a growing separation between the politics and the Portuguese people, mainly due to the image of the politicians as corrupts and the idea that all the parties are the same.

Voter turnout was slightly higher than in 1999, as 61.5% of the electorate cast a ballot.

Background

Fall of the government

After the disappointing results of the Socialist Party (PS) in the 1999 elections, the PS government entered in a series of crisis. Resignations of ministers from government and incapacity of passing legislation in Parliament led to controversial, and weird, alliances, like the 2000 and 2001 budgets which were approved by a sole CDS – People's Party (CDS–PP) Member of Parliament, Daniel Campelo, in exchange for the government approving a cheese factory in Campelo's hometown, Ponte de Lima.

The Socialist Party suffered a big, and unexpected, defeat in the December 2001 local elections. The party lost major cities across the country, mainly Lisbon, Porto, Sintra and Coimbra to the Social Democratic Party. Due to this surprising defeat, Prime Minister António Guterres announced he was to tender his resignation as Prime Minister in order to avoid the country falling "into a political swamp". Shortly after, President Jorge Sampaio accepted Guterres resignation and called snap elections for March 2002.

Leadership changes

PSD 2000 leadership election
After the 1999 election defeat, Durão Barroso's leadership started to be challenged and criticized. In January 2000, Durão Barroso called a snap party congress to resolve the leadership dispute. Alongside Barroso, Pedro Santana Lopes and Luís Marques Mendes also ran. Durão Barroso was reelected as PSD leader and the results were the following:

|- style="background-color:#E9E9E9"
! align="center" colspan=2 style="width:  60px"|Candidate
! align="center" style="width:  50px"|Votes
! align="center" style="width:  50px"|%
|-
|bgcolor=orange|
| align=left | José Manuel Durão Barroso
| align=right | 469
| align=right | 50.3
|-
|bgcolor=orange|
| align=left | Pedro Santana Lopes
| align=right | 313
| align=right | 33.6
|-
|bgcolor=orange|
| align=left | Luís Marques Mendes
| align=right | 150
| align=right | 16.1
|-
|- style="background-color:#E9E9E9"
| colspan=2 style="text-align:left;" |   Turnout
| align=right | 932
| align=center | 
|-
| colspan="4" align=left|Source: Results
|}

PS 2002 leadership election
Following the resignation of António Guterres as Prime Minister and PS leader, the party started the process to elect a new leader. The popular minister in Guterres cabinet, Eduardo Ferro Rodrigues, and PS member Paulo Penedos, were the two candidates on the ballot. Around 121,000 PS members were registered to vote. In the end, Ferro Rodrigues got almost unanimous support by being elected with almost 97% of the votes. The results were the following: 

|- style="background-color:#E9E9E9"
! align="center" colspan=2 style="width:  60px"|Candidate
! align="center" style="width:  50px"|Votes
! align="center" style="width:  50px"|%
|-
|bgcolor=|
| align=left | Eduardo Ferro Rodrigues
| align=right | 
| align=right | 96.5
|-
|bgcolor=|
| align=left | Paulo Penedos
| align=right | 
| align=right | 2.7
|-
| colspan=2 align=left | Blank/Invalid ballots
| align=right | 
| align=right | 0.8
|-
|- style="background-color:#E9E9E9"
| colspan=2 style="text-align:left;" |   Turnout
| align=right | 
| align=center | 
|-
| colspan="4" align=left|Source: Results
|}

Electoral system 

The Assembly of the Republic has 230 members elected to four-year terms. Governments do not require absolute majority support of the Assembly to hold office, as even if the number of opposers of government is larger than that of the supporters, the number of opposers still needs to be equal or greater than 116 (absolute majority) for both the Government's Programme to be rejected or for a motion of no confidence to be approved.

The number of seats assigned to each district depends on the district magnitude. The use of the d'Hondt method makes for a higher effective threshold than certain other allocation methods such as the Hare quota or Sainte-Laguë method, which are more generous to small parties.

For these elections, and compared with the 1999 elections, the MPs distributed by districts were the following:

Parties 
The table below lists the parties represented in the Assembly of the Republic during the 8th legislature (1999–2002) and that also partook in the election:

Campaign period

Party slogans

Candidates' debates

Opinion polling 

The following table shows the opinion polls of voting intention of the Portuguese voters before the election. Those parties that are listed were represented in parliament (1999-2002). Included is also the result of the Portuguese general elections in 1999 and 2002 for reference.

National summary of votes and seats 

|-
| colspan=11| 
|-
! rowspan="2" colspan=2 style="background-color:#E9E9E9" align=left|Parties
! rowspan="2" style="background-color:#E9E9E9" align=right|Votes
! rowspan="2" style="background-color:#E9E9E9" align=right|%
! rowspan="2" style="background-color:#E9E9E9" align=right|±
! colspan="5" style="background-color:#E9E9E9" align="center"|MPs
! rowspan="2" style="background-color:#E9E9E9;text-align:right;" |MPs %/votes %
|- style="background-color:#E9E9E9"
! style="background-color:#E9E9E9;text-align=center|1999
! style="background-color:#E9E9E9;text-align=center|2002
! style="background-color:#E9E9E9" align=right|±
! style="background-color:#E9E9E9" align=right|%
! style="background-color:#E9E9E9" align=right|±
|-
| 
|2,200,765||40.21||7.9||81||105||24||45.65||10.4||1.14
|-
| 
|2,068,584||37.79||6.3||115||96||19||41.74||8.3||1.10
|-
| 
|477,350||8.72||0.4||15||14||1||6.09||0.4||0.70
|-
| 
|379,870||6.94||2.1||17||12||5||5.22||2.2||0.75
|-
| 
|149,966||2.74||0.3||2||3||1||1.30||0.4||0.47
|-
| 
|36,193||0.66||0.0||0||0||0||0.00||0.0||0.0
|-
| 
|15,540||0.28||0.1||0||0||0||0.00||0.0||0.0
|-
| 
|12,398||0.23||0.1||0||0||0||0.00||0.0||0.0
|-
| 
|11,472||0.21||0.1||0||0||0||0.00||0.0||0.0
|-
| 
|4,712||0.09||||||0||||0.00||||0.0
|-
| 
|4,316||0.08||0.0||0||0||0||0.00||0.0||0.0
|-
|style="width: 10px" bgcolor=#8b0000 align="center" |
|align=left|Left Bloc/People's Democratic Union
|3,911||0.07||||||0||||0.00||||0.0
|-
|style="width: 10px" bgcolor=#000080 align="center" |
|align=left|National Solidarity
|0||0.00||0.2||0||0||0||0.00||0.0||0.0
|-
|colspan=2 align=left style="background-color:#E9E9E9"|Total valid
|width="65" align="right" style="background-color:#E9E9E9"|5,365,881
|width="40" align="right" style="background-color:#E9E9E9"|98.03
|width="40" align="right" style="background-color:#E9E9E9"|0.0
|width="40" align="right" style="background-color:#E9E9E9"|230
|width="40" align="right" style="background-color:#E9E9E9"|230
|width="40" align="right" style="background-color:#E9E9E9"|0
|width="40" align="right" style="background-color:#E9E9E9"|100.00
|width="40" align="right" style="background-color:#E9E9E9"|0.0
|width="40" align="right" style="background-color:#E9E9E9"|—
|-
|colspan=2|Blank ballots
|55,121||1.01||0.1||colspan=6 rowspan=4|
|-
|colspan=2|Invalid ballots
|52,653||0.96||0.0
|-
|colspan=2 align=left style="background-color:#E9E9E9"|Total
|width="65" align="right" style="background-color:#E9E9E9"|5,473,655
|width="40" align="right" style="background-color:#E9E9E9"|100.00
|width="40" align="right" style="background-color:#E9E9E9"|
|-
|colspan=2|Registered voters/turnout
||8,902,713||61.48||0.4
|-
| colspan=11 align=left | Source: Comissão Nacional de Eleições
|}

Distribution by constituency 

|- class="unsortable"
!rowspan=2|Constituency!!%!!S!!%!!S!!%!!S!!%!!S!!%!!S
!rowspan=2|TotalS
|- class="unsortable" style="text-align:center;"
!colspan=2 | PSD
!colspan=2 | PS
!colspan=2 | CDS–PP
!colspan=2 | CDU
!colspan=2 | BE
|-
| style="text-align:left;" | Azores
| style="background:; color:white;"|45.4
| 3
| 41.0
| 2
| 8.4
| -
| 1.4
| -
| 1.4
| -
| 5
|-
| style="text-align:left;" | Aveiro
| style="background:; color:white;"|46.4
| 8
| 33.5
| 5
| 12.9
| 2
| 2.6
| -
| 1.8
| -
| 15
|-
| style="text-align:left;" | Beja
| 21.2
| -
| style="background:; color:white;"|43.5
| 2
| 3.7
| -
| 24.2
| 1
| 1.9
| -
| 3
|-
| style="text-align:left;" | Braga
| style="background:; color:white;"|44.4
| 9
| 37.4
| 8
| 9.3
| 1
| 4.4
| -
| 1.7
| -
| 18
|-
| style="text-align:left;" | Bragança
| style="background:; color:white;"|53.2
| 3
| 30.0
| 1
| 10.9
| -
| 1.9
| -
| 0.9
| -
| 4
|-
| style="text-align:left;" | Castelo Branco
| 38.3
| 2
| style="background:; color:white;"|46.1
| 3
| 7.1
| -
| 3.3
| -
| 1.5
| -
| 5
|-
| style="text-align:left;" | Coimbra
| 41.0
| 5
| style="background:; color:white;"|41.3
| 5
| 6.7
| -
| 5.1
| -
| 2.4
| -
| 10
|-
| style="text-align:left;" | Évora
| 25.3
| 1
| style="background:; color:white;"|42.8
| 1
| 4.6
| -
| 21.8
| 1
| 1.8
| -
| 3
|-
| style="text-align:left;" | Faro
| 37.7
| 4
| style="background:; color:white;"|40.5
| 4
| 8.3
| -
| 6.3
| -
| 2.8
| -
| 8
|-
| style="text-align:left;" | Guarda
| style="background:; color:white;"|48.5
| 2
| 34.7
| 2
| 9.6
| -
| 2.2
| -
| 1.2
| -
| 4
|-
| style="text-align:left;" | Leiria
| style="background:; color:white;"|50.8
| 6
| 29.5
| 3
| 9.8
| 1
| 4.1
| -
| 2.2
| -
| 10
|-
| style="text-align:left;" | Lisbon
| 35.7
| 18
| style="background:; color:white;"|38.7
| 20
| 8.5
| 4
| 8.8
| 4
| 4.7
| 2
| 48
|-
| style="text-align:left;" | Madeira
| style="background:; color:white;"|53.5
| 4
| 25.8
| 1
| 12.1
| -
| 2.5
| -
| 3.1
| -
| 5
|-
| style="text-align:left;" | Portalegre
| 30.6
| 1
| style="background:; color:white;"|45.2
| 2
| 6.4
| -
| 12.4
| -
| 1.6
| -
| 3
|-
| style="text-align:left;" | Porto
| 40.0
| 16
| style="background:; color:white;"|41.2
| 17
| 8.4
| 3
| 4.6
| 1
| 2.7
| 1
| 38
|-
| style="text-align:left;" | Santarém
| 38.1
| 4
| style="background:; color:white;"|38.4
| 4
| 8.4
| 1
| 8.6
| 1
| 2.9
| -
| 10
|-
| style="text-align:left;" | Setúbal
| 24.7
| 5
| style="background:; color:white;"|39.3
| 7
| 6.9
| 1
| 20.5
| 4
| 4.6
| -
| 17
|-
| style="text-align:left;" | Viana do Castelo
| style="background:; color:white;"|45.5
| 3
| 35.3
| 3
| 10.3
| -
| 3.5
| -
| 1.8
| -
| 6
|-
| style="text-align:left;" | Vila Real
| style="background:; color:white;"|54.1
| 3
| 31.9
| 2
| 8.1
| -
| 2.0
| -
| 0.9
| -
| 5
|-
| style="text-align:left;" | Viseu
| style="background:; color:white;"|52.1
| 5
| 31.1
| 3
| 10.6
| 1
| 1.5
| -
| 1.4
| -
| 9
|-
| style="text-align:left;" | Europe
| 36.9
| 1
| style="background:; color:white;"|42.1
| 1
| 5.0
| -
| 4.8
| -
| 1.1
| -
| 2
|-
| style="text-align:left;" | Outside Europe
| style="background:; color:white;"|66.3
| 2
| 21.5
| -
| 3.4
| -
| 0.9
| -
| 0.4
| -
| 2
|-
|- class="unsortable" style="background:#E9E9E9"
| style="text-align:left;" | Total
| style="background:; color:white;"|40.2
| 105
| 37.8
| 96
| 8.7
| 14
| 6.9
| 12
| 2.7
| 3
| 230
|-
| colspan=12 style="text-align:left;" | Source: Comissão Nacional de Eleições
|}

Maps

Further reading

Notes

References

External links 
Preliminary results of the 2002 election
Comissão Nacional de Eleições 
Centro de Estudos do Pensamento Político

See also 
 Politics of Portugal
 List of political parties in Portugal
 Elections in Portugal

Legislative elections in Portugal
2002 elections in Portugal
March 2002 events in Europe